The 2011 World Jiu-Jitsu Championship, commonly known as the 2011 Mundials or 2011 Worlds, was an international jiu-jitsu event organised by the International Brazilian Jiu-Jitsu Federation (IBJFF) and held at California State University in Long Beach, California, USA, over four days from 2 June to 5 June 2011.

Teams results 
Results by Academy

References 

World Jiu-Jitsu Championship